Cue! (stylized in all caps) is a Japanese mobile game produced by Liber Entertainment. It launched on iOS and Android systems on October 25, 2019. The game is a simulation game where players can train up-and-coming voice actors. An anime television series adaptation by Yumeta Company and Graphinica aired from January to June 2022 on the Animeism programming block.

Characters

Flower

An up-and-coming voice actress and a high school student. She was inspired to become a voice actress after she saw a certain work.

Bird

An up-and-coming voice actress. Her family runs a restaurant, and she decided to pursue a voice acting career against their wishes.

Wind

A university student and a member of Wind. During the events of the series she accepts an offer to take up a short-term piano course in Vienna, Austria, but is still able to participate in group activities via the internet.

Moon

An 18-year-old freeter who has a chūnibyō personality.

A 19-year-old university student who wants to follow in the footsteps of her voice actress mother.

A 17-year-old up-and-coming voice actress who originally came from France.

Other characters

She serves the manager for the voice actresses at the AiRBLUE agency.

She serves as the president of AiRBLUE agency.

Media

Game
A mobile game by Liber Entertainment was released on October 25, 2019. The game temporarily ended service on April 30, 2021, in order to revise gameplay elements. On July 23, 2022 it was announced that efforts to relaunch the game had been discontinued and that the activities of the AiRBLUE idol units would be suspended.

Anime
An anime television series adaptation was announced on November 1, 2020. It is produced by Yumeta Company and Graphinica and directed by Shin Katagai, with Tatsuhiko Urahata overseeing the series' scripts, Motohiro Taniguchi designing the characters, and Ryosuke Nakanishi composing the music. It aired from January 8 to June 25, 2022, on the Animeism programming block on MBS, TBS, and BS-TBS.. The first opening theme is "Start Line", and the first ending theme is "Hajimari no Kane no Ne ga Narihibiku Sora". The second opening theme is "Tomorrow's Diary", and the second ending theme is "Yumeda Yori." All songs are performed by the group AiRBLUE. Crunchyroll licensed the series outside of Asia.

Episode list

Notes

References

External links
Game official website 
Anime official website 

2019 video games
2022 anime television series debuts
Android (operating system) games
Anime television series based on video games
Animeism
Crunchyroll anime
Graphinica
IOS games
Japan-exclusive video games
Simulation video games
Video games developed in Japan
Yumeta Company